The black-streaked scimitar babbler (Erythrogenys gravivox) is a species of bird in the family Timaliidae. It is found in China, Laos, Myanmar and Vietnam, where its natural habitats are subtropical or tropical moist lowland forest and subtropical or tropical moist montane forest.

References

black-streaked scimitar-babbler
Birds of Central China
Birds of Yunnan
black-streaked scimitar-babbler